Strathcona is a city in Roseau County, Minnesota, United States. The population was 44 at the 2010 census.

History
A post office called Strathcona has been in operation since 1905. The city was named for Donald Smith, 1st Baron Strathcona and Mount Royal.

Geography

Strathcona is located along Minnesota State Highway 32.

Demographics

2010 census
As of the census of 2010, there were 44 people, 16 households, and 10 families living in the city. The racial makeup of the city was 88.6% White and 11.4% from two or more races.

There were 16 households, of which 25.0% had children under the age of 18 living with them, 56.3% were married couples living together, 6.3% had a female householder with no husband present, and 37.5% were non-families. 31.3% of all households were made up of individuals, and 6.3% had someone living alone who was 65 years of age or older. The average household size was 2.75 and the average family size was 3.70.

The median age in the city was 33 years. 36.4% of residents were under the age of 18; 2.2% were between the ages of 18 and 24; 27.2% were from 25 to 44; 27.3% were from 45 to 64; and 6.8% were 65 years of age or older. The gender makeup of the city was 54.5% male and 45.5% female.

2000 census
As of the census of 2000, there were 29 people, 16 households, and 7 families living in the city. The racial makeup of the city was 100.00% White.

There were 16 households, out of which 12.5% had children under the age of 18 living with them, 37.5% were married couples living together, and 56.3% were non-families. 56.3% of all households were made up of individuals, and 25.0% had someone living alone who was 65 years of age or older. The average household size was 1.81 and the average family size was 2.86.

In the city, the population was spread out, with 13.8% under the age of 18, 6.9% from 18 to 24, 37.9% from 25 to 44, 20.7% from 45 to 64, and 20.7% who were 65 years of age or older. The median age was 40 years. For every 100 females, there were 93.3 males. For every 100 females age 18 and over, there were 92.3 males.

The median income for a household in the city was $23,750, and the median income for a family was $32,500. Males had a median income of $25,000 versus $0 for females. The per capita income for the city was $12,670. None of the population and none of the families were below the poverty line.

References

Cities in Minnesota
Cities in Roseau County, Minnesota